The 1964 Wightman Cup was the 36th edition of the annual women's team tennis competition between the United States and Great Britain. It was held at the All England Lawn Tennis and Croquet Club in London in England in the United Kingdom.

References

1964
1964 in tennis
1964 in American tennis
1964 in British sport
1964 in women's tennis
1964 sports events in London
1964 in English tennis
1964 in English women's sport